Cantagalo is a district of São Tomé and Príncipe, on São Tomé Island. The district seat is Santana. It is divided into the two statistical subdistricts Santana and Ribeira Afonso.

Population

Settlements
The main settlement is the town Santana. Other settlements are:

Água Izé
Anselmo Andrade
Cidade Alta
Cova Água
Guegue
Nova Olinda
Picão Flor
Praia Messias Alves
Ribeira Afonso
Riboque Santana
Santa Clotilde
Uba Budo
Zandrigo

Points of interests
Roça Água Izé
Ilhéu de Santana

Politics
Cantagalo currently has seven seats in the National Assembly.

References

 
Districts of São Tomé and Príncipe
São Tomé Island